This is a list of mayors of Landgraaf, Netherlands.

In 1982 the municipality of Landgraaf was created by the fusion of the municipalities of Nieuwenhagen, Schaesberg and Ubach over Worms.

Mayors of Dutch municipalities are appointed by the cabinet in the name of the monarch, with advice of the city council.

Mayors of Landgraaf

References 

Mayors in Limburg (Netherlands)
People from Landgraaf
Landgraaf